Clint Banbury (born 31 October 1949) is a Canadian equestrian. He competed in two events at the 1972 Summer Olympics.

References

External links
 

1949 births
Living people
Canadian male equestrians
Olympic equestrians of Canada
Equestrians at the 1972 Summer Olympics
Pan American Games medalists in equestrian
Pan American Games gold medalists for Canada
Pan American Games silver medalists for Canada
Equestrians at the 1971 Pan American Games
People from Wolseley, Saskatchewan
Sportspeople from Saskatchewan
Medalists at the 1971 Pan American Games
21st-century Canadian people
20th-century Canadian people